The Nika Award for the Lifetime Achievement Award is given annually by the Russian Academy of Cinema Arts and Science and presented at the Nika Awards. The following are the recipients of the Lifetime Achievement Award since its inception in 1988.

Recipients

1980s

1990s

2000s

2010s

2020s

References

External links
 

Nika Awards
Lifetime achievement awards
Lists of films by award